Horst Eckel (8 February 1932 – 3 December 2021) was a German footballer. He was part of the West Germany national team that won the 1954 FIFA World Cup. He was the last surviving player of the 1954 World Cup Final.

Club career
Eckel debuted in 1. FC Kaiserslautern's first team in 1947 at the age of 15. He won the German football championship with Kaiserslautern in 1951 and 1953. Eckel was playing as a right half back. As a player, Eckel was assiduous and adroit. Because of his rapid way of playing, he got the nickname Windhund (sighthound). He later played for SV Röchling Völklingen.

International career
Eckel was part of the West German team that won the 1954 FIFA World Cup and achieved the "Miracle of Bern". During that tournament, Eckel became an important pillar of the successful West Germany national team. The strength of the right side of Sepp Herberger's team was made possible due to Eckel's high defensive workrate and his passes, from which outside right Helmut Rahn and inside right Max Morlock benefitted enormously.

He also participated in the 1958 FIFA World Cup. In total he earned 32 caps.

Later life
After his career, he retrained from toolmaker to teacher, a profession he practised until his retirement in 1997.

He was an advisor for The Miracle of Bern, Sönke Wortmann's movie about the 1954 FIFA World Cup.

Eckel died on 3 December 2021, at the age of 89.
At the time of his death, Horst Eckel was the last surviving footballer who participated in the 1954 World Cup Final.

References

1932 births
2021 deaths
German footballers
People from Kaiserslautern (district)
Association football midfielders
Germany international footballers
FIFA World Cup-winning players
1954 FIFA World Cup players
1958 FIFA World Cup players
1. FC Kaiserslautern players
SV Röchling Völklingen players
Commanders Crosses of the Order of Merit of the Federal Republic of Germany
Footballers from Rhineland-Palatinate